"Alice Everyday" is the eighth single released by the American synth-pop band Book of Love. The song was released prior to the band's third album, 1991's Candy Carol, as the first single.

"Alice Everyday" was released to radio in the fall of 1990 and features sing-song lyrics and a refrain consisting of a laundry list of girls' names. In the dance clubs, the song was a moderate hit, and made it to no. 21 on the Hot Dance Club Play chart, spending nine weeks on the chart.

The track was remixed for the 12" single and CD single into three different remixes by Ben Grosse, and was released in stores on Jan. 18, 1991. All three remixes were also edited down into single mixes and released on the promo CD. "Alice Everyday" (Sam The Butcher Mix) contains samples from The Brady Bunch TV series, a drumbeat sample from Nitzer Ebb's "Let Your Body Learn", and other industrial music samples.

Also appearing on the single are the album version of title track "Candy Carol" and a 1990 remix by Ben Grosse of "With A Little Love", a song originally on the band's previous album, 1988's Lullaby.

A promotional video was shot and released for "Alice Everyday" by director Rocky Schenck. There are two versions of the video; one that uses the album version of "Alice Everyday" and the other, the 'Everyday-Glo Mix' version of the song. The video emulates the Candy Carol album cover, with the band dancing and performing inside of snow globes and wearing outfits similar to the album cover.

Track listings

1990 12" Maxi-Single (Sire Records 9 21767-0)
Side A:
"Alice Everyday" (Everyday-Glo Mix) - 6:45
"Alice Everyday" (Sunshine Day Mix) - 7:33
"With A Little Love" (1990 Version) - 3:17
Side B:
"Alice Everyday" (Sam The Butcher Mix) - 7:16
"Candy Carol" (Album Version) - 3:11

1990 CD Maxi-Single (Sire Records 9 21767-2)
"Alice Everyday" (Album Version) - 3:40
"Alice Everyday" (Everyday-Glo Mix) - 6:45
"With A Little Love" (1990 Version) - 3:17
"Alice Everyday" (Sam The Butcher Mix) - 7:16
"Alice Everyday" (Sunshine Day Mix) - 7:33
"Candy Carol" (Album Version) - 3:11

1990 Promo CD Single (Sire Records PRO-CD-4479)
"Alice Everyday" (Album Version) - 3:41
"Alice Everyday" (Everyday-Glo Single Mix) - 4:06
"Alice Everyday" (Sam The Butcher Single Mix) - 3:59
"Alice Everyday" (Sunshine Day Single Mix) - 4:04

Personnel 
"Alice Everyday" and "Candy Carol" written by Theodore Ottaviano. All instruments arranged, programmed, and performed by Book of Love.

 Susan Ottaviano - Lead vocals
 Ted Ottaviano - Keyboards, backing vocals
 Lauren Roselli - Keyboards, backing vocals
 Jade Lee - Keyboards, backing vocals

Credits
 Produced by Ted Ottaviano and Ben Grosse.
 Remix and Postproduction on 'Everyday-Glo Mix', 'Sam The Butcher Mix', 'Sunshine Day Mix' and single remix versions by Ben Grosse.
 Programming on 'Everyday-Glo Mix', 'Sam The Butcher Mix', 'Sunshine Day Mix' and single remix versions by Ben Grosse, John Vitale, David Klinger, Mark Bass.
 Assistant Engineers on 'Everyday-Glo Mix', 'Sam The Butcher Mix', 'Sunshine Day Mix' and single remix versions: Matt King, Walter Balfour.
 'Everyday-Glo Mix', 'Sam The Butcher Mix', 'Sunshine Day Mix' and single remix versions mixed at Pearl Sound Studios/Canton, MI.
 "With A Little Love" (1990 Version) remixed by Ben Grosse at The Hit Factory, Times Square, NYC. Assisted by Tom Fritze.

Charts

Official versions

" * " denotes that version is available as digital download

References

External links 
 Official music video for "Alice Everyday"
 

Book of Love (band) songs
1991 singles
1991 songs
Sire Records singles